Pełka or Fulko (died April 5, 1258, in Łęczyca) was the Archbishop of Gniezno, Poland in 1232–1258.

Neither the date nor place of his birth are known, although he was probably born in Lesser Poland. The 14th-century historian Jan Długosz claimed that he was from the knightly Lis family. Shortly after his birth his father joined the priesthood, which led to rumors about his illegitimate birth. But a commission appointed by Pope Honorius III dismissed these claims.

The date of Pełka' consecration as Archbishop of Gniezno is sometimes given as 26 June 1235. As Archbishop, Pełka continued the reforms initiated by Henryk Kietlicz and supported a centralised monarchy rather than the fragmented state. He continued the role of arbitrator between the Piast claimants to the throne. In 1234, he was an arbitrator in a dispute between Henry the Bearded and Wladyslaw Odonic of Wielkopolskie.

Pełka, like his predecessor Henryk Kietlicz, was also a defender of Church rights. He supported Thomas I, Bishop of Wrocław, in his dispute with Henry the Bearded.

He was involved in church politics. In 1238, Pope Gregory IX allowed the wearing of the cross metropolitan and he probably participated in the 1245 deliberations of the Council of Lyon and in 1253 he consecrated the first bishop of Lithuania, Dominican friar Wit (Vitas). He also oversaw the canonization of Stanislaus of Szczepanów in 1253.

In 1256, the Holy See confirmed metropolis status to Gniezno.

Pełka died April 5, 1258, in Łęczyca and was buried in the Gniezno Cathedral. A commission was appointed by Pope Innocent IV to examine the life of Pełka with a view to canonisation.

References

External links
 Virtual tour Gniezno Cathedral 

1258 deaths
Archbishops of Gniezno
Year of birth unknown